I/flancy is the third album by Hitomi Yaida released on 9 October 2002. The singles from this album were "Ring My Bell", "Andante" and "Mikansei no Melody".
The album title is an anagram of "i can fly".

The first pressing limited edition contains the 8cmCD single which can access the official website.

Track listing

Notes

External links
Lyrics @ corichan

2002 albums
Hitomi Yaida albums